The Nilgiris slender gecko (Hemiphyllodactylus nilgiriensis) is a species of gecko. It is endemic to Tamil Nadu, India.

References

Hemiphyllodactylus
Reptiles described in 2020
Endemic fauna of India
Reptiles of India
Taxa named by Ishan Agarwal
Taxa named by Aaron M. Bauer
Taxa named by Saunak Pal
Taxa named by Achyuthan N. Srikanthan
Taxa named by Akshay Khandekar